The Asian championships in sailing are a series of sailing championships in Asia organized by the Asian Sailing Federation.

List of championships

ASF championships

Class championships

Centreboard classes

Multihull classes

Board classes

References